Oluyoro Catholic Hospital (established, 1959) is the largest private hospital in Ibadan, Nigeria.  It is also known as Oluyoro Oke Ofa Catholic Hospital.

References

Hospitals established in 1959
1959 establishments in Nigeria
Catholic hospitals in Africa
Private hospitals in Ibadan